The 1983–84 Atlantic Coast Hockey League season was the third season of the Atlantic Coast Hockey League, a North American minor professional league. The Virginia Raiders folded in August 1983. Six teams participated in the regular season. The Birmingham Bulls folded after only three games. Henry Brabham bought the Nashville South Stars mid-season and moved the franchise to Salem, Virginia and renamed them as the Virginia Lancers. The Erie Golden Blades were the league champions.

Regular season

Playoffs

External links
 Season 1983/84 on hockeydb.com

Atlantic Coast Hockey League seasons
ACHL